Asaka may refer to:

Cities
 Asaka, Saitama, Japan
 Asaka, Uzbekistan

People
 Asaka-no-miya (朝香) ōke (princely house), a branch of the Japanese Imperial Family
 Asaka (musician) (born 1999), Japanese singer
, Japanese comedian
, Japanese singer
, Japanese actress
, Japanese storyboard artist and director
, Japanese actress
, Japanese actress and singer

Other uses 
 Fukushima Prefectural Asaka High School
 Asaka Station (disambiguation)
 Asaka, a character from the musical Once on This Island
 , a character from the tokusatsu Kaitou Sentai Lupinranger VS Keisatsu Sentai Patranger

See also
 Azaka (disambiguation)

Japanese-language surnames

Japanese feminine given names